Andrew Phillip Brookes (born 31 July 1969) is a former English cricketer. Brookes was a right-handed batsman who bowled right-arm off break. He was born at Solihull, Warwickshire.

Brookes represented the Warwickshire Cricket Board in a single List A match against  Berkshire in the 1999 NatWest Trophy.  In his only List A match, he scored an unbeaten 6 runs and took a single wicket at a cost of 21 runs.

References

External links
Andrew Brookes at Cricinfo
Andrew Brookes at CricketArchive

1969 births
Living people
Sportspeople from Solihull
People from Warwickshire
English cricketers
Warwickshire Cricket Board cricketers